Jennifer Ann Kiggans (née Moore; born June 18, 1971) is an American politician and nurse practitioner serving as the U.S. representative for Virginia's 2nd congressional district. A Republican, Kiggans is a former United States Navy helicopter pilot. She defeated incumbent Elaine Luria in the 2022 election.

Early life and career
Kiggans was born in Tampa, Florida, and graduated from high school in Orlando, Florida. As a high school student, she worked in Walt Disney World. She is an alumna of Boston University. In 1993 and 1994, she taught English in Japan through the JET Programme. She also lived in Japan as a Navy spouse for five years.

Kiggans was a United States Navy pilot for ten years, flying H-46 and H-3 helicopters.

After serving in the military, Kiggans attended nursing school at Old Dominion University and Vanderbilt University School of Nursing. She is an adult geriatric nurse practitioner at Eastern Virginia Medical School and in private practice.

Early political career
In 2019, Kiggans ran for the Virginia Senate for the 7th district, which was being vacated by Republican incumbent Frank Wagner. In the Republican Party primary, Kiggans defeated Virginia Beach School Board member Carolyn Weems, 52% to 48%.

In the general election, Kiggans faced Democratic state Delegate Cheryl Turpin. The race was viewed as competitive, as the district had very narrowly favored Democrats in recent statewide elections. Kiggans and Turpin each spent over $500,000 on television advertisements. Kiggans won, 50.4% to 49.5%.

U.S. House of Representatives

Elections

2022 

Kiggans was the Republican nominee for Virginia's 2nd congressional district in the 2022 election. She defeated Democratic incumbent Elaine Luria in the November 2022 general election.

Political positions

2020 presidential election
Kiggans has consistently refused to state whether she believes that Joe Biden was legitimately elected president and has called for a $70 million forensic audit of Virginia's 2020 presidential election results; a previous audit of those results found no evidence of fraud. She has said that she does not believe the FBI search of Mar-a-Lago was justified.

Abortion
Kiggans supports banning abortions after fifteen weeks of pregnancy, except for in cases of rape, incest, or to protect the life of the mother. In June 2022, she expressed support for the U.S. Supreme Court's ruling in Dobbs v. Jackson Women's Health Organization, which overruled Roe v. Wade.

Gun rights
Kiggans was endorsed by the NRA.

Infrastructure
Kiggans said on social media that she would have voted against the Infrastructure Investment and Jobs Act.

Caucus memberships 
 Republican Main Street Partnership

Personal life
Kiggans is a lifelong Catholic. She is married to Steve Kiggans, a retired Navy F-18 pilot. They have four children.

References

External links
 Congresswoman Jen Kiggans official U.S. House website
 Campaign website
 
 
 Jen Kiggans at the Virginia Public Access Project

|-

1971 births
21st-century American politicians
21st-century American women politicians
Advanced practice registered nurses
American expatriates in Japan
American Roman Catholics
American women nurses
Aviators from Florida
Aviators from Virginia
Catholics from Florida
Catholics from Virginia
Female members of the United States House of Representatives
Living people
Military personnel from Florida
Military personnel from Virginia
Nurses from Virginia
People from Orlando, Florida
Politicians from Tampa, Florida
Politicians from Virginia Beach, Virginia
Republican Party members of the United States House of Representatives from Virginia
Republican Party Virginia state senators
Women United States Naval Aviators
Women state legislators in Virginia